Ubaida Ansari (1944–2014) was a Pakistani actress. She acted in numerous television dramas. She was known for her roles in dramas Quddusi Sahab Ki Bewah, Yeh Zindagi Hai, Meri Saheli Meri Humjoli, Rehaai and Zard Mausam.

Early life
Ubaida was born in 1944 in Karachi, Pakistan.

Career
In 1960 she started working at Radio Pakistan in Lahore. She was noted for her high pitch voice. She was noted for her work in drama Zeenat, Khala Kulsoom Ka Kumba and Tum Hi To Ho. She also appeared in dramas Saagar Ka Ansoo, Stolen and Mera Muqaddam Tum Lado Gay. In 1998 she appeared in movie Jinnah. She also appeared in the drama Yeh Zindagi Hai and Yeh Zindagi Hai Season 2 as Kulsoom which was the longest-running television series. Since then she appeared in a variety of dramas Quddusi Sahab Ki Bewah, Zard Mausam and Rehaai.

Personal life
Ubaida was married.

Illness and death
She was in a critical condition for a past few days. She died on 21 March in 2014 in Karachi.

Filmography

Television

Telefilm

Film

References

External links
 

1944 births
20th-century Pakistani actresses
Pakistani television actresses
2014 deaths
21st-century Pakistani actresses
Pakistani film actresses